Kent Records was a Los Angeles-based record label, launched in 1958 by the Bihari brothers. It was subsidiary of Crown Records Corporation. Kent was a follow-up to Modern Records, which ceased operations in 1958. The label reissued Modern's singles, including recordings by B.B. King. By 1964, Kent had signed acts such as Ike & Tina Turner and released new material. Other acts signed to the label included Z.Z. Hill, Johnny Otis, and Lowell Fulsom. Modern Records was revived in 1964 with successful singles from the Ikettes.

Initially, Kent issued only singles, but issued albums from 1964 until the early 1970s. Kent was later bought by Ace Records, England, which uses the label name to release Motown and Northern Soul music.

Discography

Albums 

 1964: Ike & Tina Turner Revue Live
 1965: Live! B. B. King on Stage
 1965: Lowell Fulsom – Soul
 1966: The Soul of Ike & Tina
 1970: Festival of Live Performances
 1970: Various – Rock And Roll Festival Volume 1
 1970: Neil Merryweather, John Richardson And Boers
 1971: Z.Z. Hill's Greatest Hits: Dues Paid in Full

Singles

See also
 List of record labels
Kent Records artists

References

Defunct record labels of the United States